Queensbury is a civil parish in York County, New Brunswick, Canada.

For governance purposes it forms the local service district of the parish of Queensbury, which is a member of Regional Service Commission 11 (RSC11).

Origin of name
The area was settled by the Queen's Rangers, a Loyalist unit named in honour of Queen Charlotte.

History
Queensbury was erected in 1786 as one of the original parishes of York County.

In 1824 part of Queensbury was included in the newly erected Douglas Parish.

In 1835 the boundary between Queensbury and Douglas was moved upriver, removing territory from Queensbury.

In 1842 the interior boundary with Douglas was altered.

In 1847 four islands in the Saint John River were transferred from Prince William Parish. Big Coac, Little Coac, and Great Bear all appear on the cadastral map of the area; Bloodworth appears as Heustis Island, which was granted to N. Bloodworth.

In 1865 the boundary with Southampton Parish was altered, adding the remainder of the Caverhill Settlement to Queensbury.

In 1973 all mention of islands in the Saint John River was removed. The islands were flooded by the Mactaquac Dam.

Boundaries
Queensbury Parish is bounded:

 on the northeast beginning where the Burnt Lake Branch crosses the Bright Parish line, about 2.6 kilometres northwesterly of the Central Hainesville Road and about 3.1 kilometres northeasterly of where Route 104 crosses the East Branch Nackawic Stream, on the prolongation of the central line of a two-lot grant to Jonathan Williams on the Saint John River, then running southeasterly along the prolongation and the Williamson line to the Saint John, about 675 metres south of the mouth of Currie Brook;
 on the southeast and southwest by the Saint John River;
 on the northwest by a line beginning on the shore of the Saint John about 150 metres downstream of the mouth of Quigg Brook, then running northeasterly about 6.4 kilometres along the upper line of a large grant to Major Richard Armstrong and its prolongation to the southeastern line of a grant to William Dobie, about 1.7 kilometres northwesterly of Route 610, then northwesterly about 750 metres along the Dobie grant and its prolongation to the rear line of a grant to John Morehouse, then northeasterly and northwesterly along the Morehouse grant to the East Branch Nackawic Stream, then up the East Branch Nackawic and the Burnt Lake Branch to the starting point.

Governance
The entire parish forms the local service district of the parish of Queensbury, established in 1966 to assess for fire protection. Community services were added in 1967 and first aid and ambulance services in 1978.

Communities
Communities at least partly within the parish.

  Bear Island
 Day Hill
 Granite Hill
 Lower Caverhill
 Lower Line Queensbury
 Lower Queensbury
 McNallys
 Middle Hainesville
  Scotch Lake
 Springfield
 Staples Settlement
 Upper Caverhill
 Upper Hainesville
  Upper Queensbury
 Wiggins Mill

Bodies of water
Bodies of water at least partly within the parish.

  Saint John River
 Coac Reach
 Nackawic Bend
 Scoodawakscook Bend
 Burtt Lake Branch
 Coac Stream
 Little Mactaquac Stream
 Mactaquac Stream
 Mactaquac Stream Basin
 Mill Stream
 East Branch Nackawic Stream
 Mazerall Creek
 Pinder Creek
 Sandy Creek
 Campbell Lake
 Coac Lake
  Mactaquac Lake
 Scotch Lake

Other notable places
Parks, historic sites, and other noteworthy places at least partly within the parish.
 Mill Stream-Mactaquac Protected Natural Area
  Scottsfield Airpark Airport

Demographics

Population
Population trend

Language
Mother tongue (2016)

See also
List of parishes in New Brunswick

Notes

References

External links
 York Rural Community Project

Local service districts of York County, New Brunswick
Parishes of York County, New Brunswick